Alonzo Mitchell (January 2, 1905 – October, 1963), nicknamed "Fluke", was an American Negro league pitcher and manager for several teams between 1921 and 1941.

A native of Jacksonville, Florida, Mitchell attended Morris Brown College, and was the younger brother of fellow-Negro leaguer Arnett Mitchell. A side-arm curveballer, he continued to pitch effectively into his later career, when he served as player-manager for the Jacksonville Red Caps and Cleveland Bears. Mitchell died in Jacksonville in 1963 at age 58.

References

External links
 and Baseball-Reference Black Baseball stats and Seamheads
  and Seamheads
 Alonzo Mitchell at Negro Leagues Baseball Museum

1905 births
1963 deaths
Akron Black Tyrites players
Atlanta Black Crackers players
Bacharach Giants players
Birmingham Black Barons players
Cleveland Bears players
Harrisburg Giants players
Jacksonville Red Caps players
Newark Stars players
Baseball pitchers
Baseball players from Jacksonville, Florida
20th-century African-American sportspeople